The 2016 AFL draft consisted of the various periods where the 18 clubs in the Australian Football League (AFL) could trade and recruit players following the completion of the 2016 AFL season. Additions to each club's playing list are not allowed at any other time during the year.

The key dates for the trading and drafting periods were:
The free agency offer period; held between 7 October and 19 October. Three further free agency periods were held for delisted players, between 1 November and 8 November, 10 November to 18 November, and 26 November to 27 November,
The trade period; held between 10 October and 20 October,
The 2016 national draft; held on 25 November, at the Hordern Pavilion, which included live bidding for academy and father-son selections.
The 2017 pre-season draft; which was to be held on 28 November, but was cancelled when all clubs declined to take part, and
The 2017 rookie draft; which was held on 28 November.

Player movements

Previous trades
The 2015 AFL draft included a new initiative whereby clubs could trade future picks; through this scheme, fourteen picks in the 2016 draft were traded prior to the commencement of the 2016 trade period:

Trades

Note 
The numbering of the draft picks in this list may be different to the agreed draft picks at the time of the trade, due to adjustments from either the insertion of free agency compensation draft picks or clubs exiting the draft before later rounds.

Free agency

Note 
Due to James Kelly and Matt Dea being signed as top up players because of the 2012 Essendon supplements saga, they had to be delisted and then re-signed in order to stay on Essendon's list.

Retirements and delistings

2016 national draft
The  received a priority pick at the end of the first round (pick 19) after a request by the club to the AFL commission was accepted. It was the first time a priority pick was given to a club since the rules regarding priority selections were changed in 2012.

A change was made to the rules concerning academy and father-son selections which allowed clubs to begin the draft with only as many draft picks as it had empty positions on its playing list. This was intended to end the practice which had taken place the previous year in which clubs with academies had traded down the draft order to accumulate a large number of mid- and low-range draft picks specifically to use on academy bids.

Final draft order

 Notes
 Free agency compensation picks are additional selections awarded to teams based on their net loss of players during the free agency trade period.
 Academy players are local zone selections available to the four New South Wales and Queensland clubs. Both academy and father-son selections are subject to a bidding process, where the club with the family or academy connection must match any opposition club's bid with their next available selection.

Rookie elevations
Clubs were able to promote any player who was listed on their rookie list in 2016 to their 2017 primary playing list prior to the draft.

2017 rookie draft

Category B rookie selections

During the trade period, clubs could nominate category B rookies to join their club.

See also
 2016 AFL Women's draft

References

Australian Football League draft
Draft
AFL Draft
2010s in Sydney
Australian rules football in New South Wales
Sport in Sydney
Events in Sydney